Alexei Pavlov (also Alexey Pavlov, ; born November 4, 1974) is a Russian former swimmer, who specialized in sprint freestyle and breaststroke events. Pavlov competed for Russia in the men's 4×100 m freestyle relay at the 2000 Summer Olympics. Teaming with Russian imports Sergey Ashihmin, Dmitri Kuzmin, and Konstantin Ushkov, silver medalist in Atlanta four years earlier, in heat two, Pavlov anchored the race with a split of 52.73, but the newly bred Russian team rounded out the eight-team field to last place and twentieth overall in a final time of 3:25.03.

References

External links
 

1974 births
Living people
Russian male freestyle swimmers
Kyrgyzstani male freestyle swimmers
Olympic swimmers of Kyrgyzstan
Swimmers at the 2000 Summer Olympics
Russian emigrants to Kyrgyzstan
Kyrgyzstani people of Russian descent